Solo Piano Album is an album by American jazz pianist Don Pullen recorded in 1975 for the Canadian Sackville label. In 2014 Delmark Records, which purchased the catalog of the Sackville label, reissued the album under the title Richard's Tune with two bonus tracks.

Reception
The AllMusic review by Scott Yanow awarded the album 3 stars stating "Don Pullen's debut as a leader around a decade after he first appeared on the ESP label as a sideman finds the percussive and adventurous pianist already displaying a fairly distinctive style".

Track listing
All compositions by Don Pullen
 "Richard's Tune" - 8:25 
 "Suite (Sweet) Malcom (Part 1: Memories and Gunshots)" - 15:39 
 "Big Alice" - 10:07 
 "Song Played Backwards" - 9:13 
Recorded at Thunder Sound in Toronto, Canada on February 24, 1975

Richard's Tune bonus tracks (Delmark CD reissue)
 "Kadji" - 8:29 
 "Big Alice (alternate)" - 9:18

Personnel
Don Pullen - piano

References

Solo piano jazz albums
Sackville Records albums
Don Pullen albums
1975 albums